The 18th Agon Cup began on 21 April 2011 – 1 October 2011. Two Korean amateur players were invited to the preliminaries, with both qualifying. Ha Sungbong defeated professionals Yanigasawa Satoshi and Furuya Yutaka. Kim Sungjin defeated 25th Honinbo and Japan's top title holder Cho Chikun. He also defeated Kato Atsushi. In the main tournament, he was knocked out by Iyama Yuta Meijin in the first round. Iyama Yuta came out as the winner. He beat Yamashita Keigo at the final. The winner's prize was ¥10,000,000.

Tournament

References

2011 in go
Go competitions in Japan